Vale High School is a public high school in Vale, Oregon, United States. It is a part of Vale School District 84.

The Vale School District takes students from Vale and Brogan, as well as the unincorporated community of Willowcreek. Vale High also takes high school students from Juntura.

Academics
The graduation rate has risen over the past 12 years. In 2008, the school's graduation rate was 87% with 80 of the 92 senior students receiving a high school diploma. In 2022, the school's graduation rate was 97% with 66 of the 67 senior students receiving a high school diploma. Vale High School is ranked #10,602 in the country, and #123 in the state of Oregon.

Notable alumni
 Lynn Findley (1970), state representative
 Dave Wilcox (1960), NFL

References

External links
 Vale High School

High schools in Malheur County, Oregon
Vale, Oregon
Public high schools in Oregon